Toriel is a fictional character and is the first area boss in the role-playing video game Undertale. A motherly figure created as an embodiment of excessive video game tutorials, she is a member of the monster race with hanging ears, small horns, white fur, and a purple robe. Literally "hand-holding" the player through the opening sections of the game, the player must attempt to leave the area, upon which point they fight her. The player can choose to kill her or convince her to stop fighting, which affects the way the story plays out. 

The character has received attention from critics and fans for her personality as well as the atypical moral choice of her boss battle. A version of the character also appears in Deltarune.

History and appearances

Undertale
The player meets Toriel shortly after they fall into the Underground, where she is seen as a motherly figure who desires to protect the player from its dangers. She teaches the player the mechanics of the game, encouraging them to show mercy to enemies rather than attack them. Giving the player a phone with which to contact her, she leaves the player on their own to figure out the rest of the Ruins, after which they arrive at her house. 

While she attempts to take care of the player, they become restless and attempt to leave the Ruins. Having seen several human children die at the hands of Asgore Dreemurr, the king of the Underground, she fears for the player's safety and confronts them in battle. If the player chooses not to kill her, the battle is "long and arduous" with little indication that the player's tactics are working until she relents. In fact, she must be spared many times in order to persuade her to allow the player to leave the Ruins. If Toriel is betrayed by killing her after she relents, however, she tells the player that she regrets having tried to raise the player. If the player loads the game after battling Toriel to view an alternate outcome, Flowey appears and mocks the player for their actions, establishing the use of saved games as a plot element in Undertale. If she is killed upon killing 20 randomly-encountered enemies in the Ruins, she remarks that she wasn't protecting the player from the rest of the Underground, she was protecting the rest of the Underground by attempting to keep the player in the Ruins. Doing this causes the game to go down a darker "no mercy" (often called "Genocide") route for as long as the player continues to kill all of the enemies they encounter.

It is later revealed that Toriel was once Asgore's wife, and they had a son, Asriel. When Asriel died, she gave up her crown due to her disgust at Asgore's decision to kill human children for their souls in order to break the "Barrier" keeping the monsters trapped in the Underground.

Near the end of the True Pacifist story route, Toriel arrives at "New Home" (The Underground's capital) and stops Asgore and the player from fighting. However, Flowey appears and absorbs her soul along with that of all the other monsters in the Underground to gain the form of "Asriel, the God of Hyper-Death". Later on, after the player has fought Asriel, who uses the human souls and his immense power to break the Barrier, Toriel and the other monsters leave the Underground, returning to the Surface. Toriel offers to provide a home for the human; the player can choose to accept or reject this, which leads to a differing post-credits scene depending on the choice. In the non-playable True Pacifist epilogue, we see that Toriel has achieved her dream of founding and teaching a school.

Deltarune
In Deltarune, Toriel is the adoptive mother of Kris and the biological mother of Asriel. She wakes Kris up at the beginning of Chapter one and drops them off at school. After returning from the Dark World, Kris receives a call from Toriel, who tells them that they are in trouble for being late. However, she seems pleased to hear that Kris has made a friend, and allows Kris to explore the town before coming home. In the game's second chapter, she can be seen conversing with Alphys about Kris' well-being during the prologue; in the epilogue, she invites Susie into the Dreemurr household, and suggests that she spend the night after she realises that her car tires had been slashed, unbeknownst to the two of them by Kris, before all three of them are consumed by what is implied to be a Dark Fountain that Kris opens. It is implied in the game that Toriel works as a teacher for a younger class at Kris' school.

Development 
Toriel was initially envisioned by the game's creator, Toby Fox, as a "tutorial person that can't stand to see you leave". She was later incorporated as the latter boss of the two bosses (the former being Napstablook) of the game's demo, which was used to promote its successful Kickstarter campaign.

Merchandise 
An official Toriel plush was released by Fangamer. The plush contains a white heart soul inside, which can only be found if the plush is cut apart. This detail reflects her death scene in Undertale, and was described by Kotaku as "weirdly unsettling". A figure of Toriel was also released by Fangamer as part of a set.

Reception 
Jess Joho of Kill Screen called the character "relying on the inhumanly selfless portrait of motherhood", but doing so with a purpose, praising the boss encounter with her as respecting the player's ability to think through a problem, as well as their basic instincts as a human being. She stated that the game holds up a mirror to "patriarchal" game design that encourages players to impatiently "sacrifice their own mother and humanity" rather than engaging with the enemy on a "human level".

Nathan Grayson of Kotaku stated that while he killed Toriel during his playthrough, his encounter with her made him cry due to her friendliness and relatability as a character. He also praised the game for remembering this on his next playthrough. Jack de Quidt of Rock, Paper, Shotgun called the tutorial sequence featuring her "beautifully paced" and praised the character, saying "Toriel's all right", while Richard Cobbett of the same site called her sprite animations "understated but effective".

Julie Muncy of Kill Screen criticized the encounter with Toriel as unintuitive, saying that she lost the ability to trust the game after being seemingly forced to kill Toriel, which forced her onto the game's "Neutral" route.

References 

Anthropomorphic video game characters
Fiction about goats
Female characters in video games
Queen characters in video games
Video game bosses
Video game characters introduced in 2015
Video game characters with fire or heat abilities
Video game characters who use magic
Undertale
Fictional explorers in video games
Fictional criminals in video games
Fictional female religious workers
Religious worker characters in video games
Fictional female criminals
Fictional female murderers
Fictional female domestic workers
Fictional female medical personnel
Video game characters with accelerated healing
Fictional female martial artists